Manduca corallina is a moth of the family Sphingidae first described by Herbert Druce in 1883.

Distribution 
It is found from Mexico, Belize, Guatemala, Nicaragua and Costa Rica south to Venezuela.

Description 
The wingspan is 104–110 mm. The thorax (especially in the male) is less robust than the similar Manduca lichenea. Furthermore, the wings are more elongate, but with a very similar pattern.

Biology 
Adults are on wing year round.

The larvae feed on Cordia alliodora. They have a very rough skin, two dorsal yellow stripes and side slashes on their green body.

References

Manduca
Moths described in 1883
Taxa named by Herbert Druce